A General Theory of Exploitation and Class is a 1982 book about the exploitation of labour and social class by the economist and political scientist John Roemer. The book was first published in the United States by Harvard University Press.

The book received positive reviews, and was discussed in a dedicated issue of Politics & Society. However, reviewers described Roemer's conclusions as controversial. A General Theory of Exploitation and Class is considered part of analytical Marxism.

Summary

Roemer aims to "embed the Marxian theory of exploitation in a more general theory of exploitation which will be capable of specializing to cases other than capitalism", and in particular to socialism. He argues that this would make it possible to "propose a theory of exploitation and class for socialism which can provide a basis for a materialist political theory of socialism." He also discusses the labor theory of value.

Publication history
A General Theory of Exploitation and Class was first published by Harvard University Press in 1982.

Reception
A General Theory of Exploitation and Class received positive reviews from Margaret Levi in the American Political Science Review and Trond Petersen in Acta Sociologica, and a mixed review from Michael A. Lebowitz in the Canadian Journal of Economics.

Levi described the book as "extremely ambitious and important" but also controversial. She credited Roemer with providing an alternative to traditional ways of thinking about exploitation and class, and praised his "grandeur of vision" and "brilliance of argument and insight". However, she believed that the book also had "serious failings", noting that they had been discussed in Politics & Society, where Roemer had been criticized by the sociologist Erik Olin Wright, the philosopher Andrew Levine, and the social and political theorist Jon Elster, as well as from Levi herself. Petersen described the book as "a novel and controversial contribution to the Marxian theory of exploitation and class", noting that it had received praise from political scientists, sociologists, mathematical economists, and philosophers and that Politics & Society had devoted an entire issue to it. He believed that its results would challenge both Marxist and non-Marxist social science. However, he noted that the assumptions underlying Roemer's methodology were open to question. He compared Roemer's views to those of the sociologist Max Weber.

Lebowitz wrote that Roemer employed elegant models and techniques and offered admirable discussions of many issues. However, he considered Roemer's conclusions about the Marxian theory of exploitation, and "the character of modern socialist states", controversial, and questioned Roemer's treatment of both subjects, arguing that they rested on flawed assumptions. Nevertheless, he concluded that Roemer had taken, "the consideration of exploitation on to a new, promising terrain."

A General Theory of Exploitation and Class is considered a representative work of analytical Marxism, comparable to the philosopher G. A. Cohen's Karl Marx's Theory of History (1978) and Elster's Making Sense of Marx (1985). The book is the classic reconstruction of theories of exploitation and class within analytical Marxism, and forms part of a highly influential body of work on exploitation. However, Roemer noted that after the publication of A General Theory of Exploitation and Class, several good criticisms had been made of the "property-relations definition of capitalist exploitation" he advanced in the work, and that he had revised his thinking in response. Wright and Levine, writing with the philosopher Elliott Sober, noted that Marxists tend to define classes in terms of the mechanisms by which surplus products or surplus labor is appropriated, rather than by property relations as such. They credited Roemer with presenting "an important dissenting view in which a property relations definition of class is defended in Marxist terms".

References

Bibliography
Books

 
 
 
 
 
 

Journals

  
 
  

1982 non-fiction books
American non-fiction books
Analytic philosophy literature
Books about economic inequality
Books about labour
Economics books
English-language books
Harvard University Press books
Marxist books